Billdal is a bimunicipal locality situated in Kungsbacka Municipality, Halland County, and Gothenburg Municipality, Västra Götaland County, in Sweden. It had 10,289 inhabitants in 2010. It mainly consists of villas and terraced houses, grouped along a windling coastline with many islands.

Notable natives
Dark Tranquillity
In Flames

See also
Greater Gothenburg

References 

Populated places in Gothenburg Municipality
Populated places in Kungsbacka Municipality
Metropolitan Gothenburg